Grande Prairie Roman Catholic Separate School District No. 28 or Grande Prairie and District Catholic Schools is a separate school authority within the Canadian province of Alberta operated out of Grande Prairie.

Schools

See also 
List of school authorities in Alberta

References

External links 

 
Grande Prairie
School districts in Alberta